Malpais (9°36'03 N, 85°08'36 W) is a town in Puntarenas Province, Costa Rica which began as a fishing and cattle-farming village, and has become popular among surfers and adventure travelers around the world.  Recently, Forbes Magazine voted the beaches of Malpais and neighboring Santa Teresa as "One of the ten most beautiful in the world."

The town got its name from the fact that all the rivers and streams that flow into the beach in the area dry up in the summer season, making it a "bad land" to try to live in.

Malpais now is known for its incredible beauty, with white sand coves, rocky outcroppings, steep jungle-covered hills, and forests teeming with animals, birds, and insects.

The area has recently become famous due to several celebrities buying land and building dream houses, Mel Gibson, Gisele Bündchen and Bobbie Phillips, who began bringing celebrities to town several years ago with her private hideaway retreat in the hills of Mal Pais. Casa Chameleon celeb hideaway has won awards from Condé Nast Publications as well as travel sites such as Sherman's Travel. Many A-listers have been spotted around the beaches and cafes of Mal Pais, but there doesn't seem to be a need for them to be flanked by bodyguards, just yet. The area is still remote and undeveloped. Complete with pot-holed dirt roads that become very muddy in the rainy season (July–October) and dry like powder in the dry season (November–May). The area is very spread out and transportation is a must. Most locals get around on quad bikes and motorcycles. Most of these have surf racks on them and it would be an odd day to travel the area without seeing someone with a surfboard heading to the nearby breaks.

While Malpais is still a remote fishing village, it also is known for modern day luxuries. Many excellent hotels and luxury houses have been built in recent years, and there are many excellent restaurants, with cuisine from around the world.

Gallery

References

Further reading
 Lonely Planet Costa Rica 

Populated places in Puntarenas Province